Wholesaling or distributing is the sale of goods or merchandise to retailers; to industrial, commercial, institutional or other professional business users; or to other wholesalers (wholesale businesses) and related subordinated services. In general, it is the sale of goods in bulk to anyone, either a person or an organization, other than the end consumer of that merchandise. Wholesaling is buying goods in bulk quantity, usually directly from the manufacture or source, at a discounted rate. The retailer then sells the goods to the end consumer at a higher price making a profit. 

According to the United Nations Statistics Division, wholesale is the resale of new and used goods to retailers, to industrial, commercial, institutional or professional users, or to other wholesalers, or involves acting as an agent or broker in buying merchandise for, or selling merchandise to, such persons or companies. Wholesalers frequently physically assemble, sort, and grade goods in large lots, break-bulk, repack, and redistribute in smaller lots. While wholesalers of most products usually operate from independent premises, wholesale marketing for foodstuffs can take place at specific wholesale markets where all traders are congregated.

Traditionally, wholesalers were closer to the markets they supplied than the source from which they got the products. However, with the advent of the internet and e-procurement there is an increasing number of wholesalers located nearer to the manufacturers in China, Taiwan, and Southeast Asia. The profit margins of wholesalers depend largely on their ability to achieve market competitive transaction costs.

In the banking industry "wholesale" usually refers to wholesale banking, providing tailored services to large customers, in contrast with retail banking, providing standardized services to large numbers of smaller customers.

In real estate, wholesaling is the act of contracting to purchase real property, and assigning that contract to an investor.

Taxes
Often, in the United States, wholesalers are not required to charge their buyers sales tax, if the buyer has a resale license in the state the wholesaler is located. Out-of-state buyers are not charged sale tax by wholesalers.

Direct selling

The alternative to selling wholesale to distributors or retailers is to sell retail either through company-owned stores or online. Advantages include receiving a larger slice of the price paid by the consumer; disadvantages include difficulty in reaching consumers. Direct selling is a business model wherein sellers sell the goods directly to the end customer.

See also

 Business-to-business
 Cash and carry (wholesale)
 Distribution (marketing)
 Jobbing house
 Supply chain
 Supply network

References

 
Freight transport